Kim Ji-young (born September 7, 1974) is a South Korean actress. She won several Best Supporting Actress awards for playing an indomitable handball player in the 2008 sports drama Forever the Moment. Kim also starred in leading roles in the televisions series My Lovely Fool (2006), Two Wives (2009), Marry Me, Please (also known as All About Marriage, 2010), and Everybody Say Kimchi (2014), as well as the film Touch (2012).

Filmography

Film

Television series

Web series

Variety/radio show

Theater

Awards and nominations

References

External links

 
 
 
 
 

1974 births
Living people
20th-century South Korean actresses
21st-century South Korean actresses
South Korean television actresses
South Korean film actresses
People from North Chungcheong Province
Hanyang University alumni